The World Is Full of Married Men is a 1979 British romantic drama film directed by Robert William Young, based on Jackie Collins' 1968 novel of the same name.

Plot
When Linda Cooper (Carroll Baker), the wife of advertising executive David Cooper (Anthony Franciosa), discovers his adulterous affairs including his current one with ambitious model Claudia Parker (Sherrie Lee Cronn), she decides to embark on her own affair with rock singer Gem Gemini (Paul Nicholas).

Cast
 Anthony Franciosa as David Cooper
 Carroll Baker as Linda Cooper
 Sherrie Lee Cronn as Claudia Parker
 Paul Nicholas as Gem Gemini
 Gareth Hunt as Jay Grossman
 Georgina Hale as Lori Grossman
 Anthony Steel as Conrad Lee
 John Nolan as Joe
 Jean Gilpin as Miss Field
 Moira Downie as Gerda
 Alison Elliott as Sharon
 Eva Louise as Mercedes Benz
 Joanne Ridley as Joanie
 Emma Ridley as Lucy
 Roy Scammell as Jeff Spencer
Susie Silvey as Girl in Hotel
 Stephanie Marrian as Girl in Hotel

Production
A film adaptation of Collins' novel was announced to capitalize on the successes of The Stud (1978) and The Bitch (1979), two of Collins' other novels adapted for the screen. The film is set in the late 1970s, as opposed to the novel's 1960s setting.

According to Collins' website, "the glamorous but seedy world of entertainment provides the setting for Jackie Collins' explosive expose' of sexual double standards and naked ambition."

It marked the first time in several years that Anthony Steel had been seen in a widely distributed film in English speaking countries.

Soundtrack
Due to its setting, the film's soundtrack, released as a double album by Ronco Records, made extensive use of disco music, including Maxine Nightingale's "Right Back Where We Started From", and even featured an appearance by famed dance troupe Hot Gossip. Welsh singer Bonnie Tyler had a UK Top 40 hit with the title track to the film, and also appeared in the film, performing the song during the opening credits.

Release and reception
The film premiered in London on 30 May 1979 before opening a week later. It wouldn't see a North American theatrical release until March 1980.

Variety called it "sexploitation melodrama which, cunningly, will titillate both sexes." Franciosa "brings a mercifully light touch", Nicholas was "uncharismatic", and Hale was "effective as a laconic wife".

References

External links
 

1979 films
1979 romantic drama films
British romantic drama films
Films about infidelity
Films based on British novels
Films directed by Robert Young
Films shot at Pinewood Studios
1970s English-language films
1970s British films